Frankfurter Berg is a quarter of Frankfurt am Main, Germany, situated on a hill above the river Nidda. It is part of the Ortsbezirk Nord-Ost.

References 

Districts of Frankfurt